Last vehicle board, often abbreviated as LV board, is a signaling board used on trains in some countries.

Usage

In India

The last vehicle of a train is supposed to carry a red lamp at the rear. Earlier, the requirement was for merely an oil lamp, which was often missing or very feeble. In recent years provision of an electric lamp, as mandated by the rules, has become more common.

Last vehicle indications are of different types. A large 'X' is often seen painted on the rear of the coach that is the last one. A set of concentric circles may also be seen, although this seems to be going out of use as of 2008. EMU/DMU rakes have a smaller painted 'X' (red on white) at the rear, or sometimes a series of diagonal strokes painted on; these painted symbols are all in addition to the lamp mentioned above.  In addition, a small board with 'LV' (black on yellow) is often attached to the rear of the vehicle (it stands for Last Vehicle).

If a train passes by a station or signal cabin without the appropriate last vehicle indication (or without confirmation of the number of coaches or wagons), it is assumed that the train has separated and suitable emergency procedures are brought into play.

There are some cases where a last vehicle indication is not required — for instance, when the number of coaches or wagons in a train can be passed on to each block section after verification from the previous block section at the time the line clear indication is obtained (and with exchange of private numbers). The information is also provided to the section controllers. In some cases when working entirely within one block section, an 'LV' sign is not needed if the number of coaches or wagons is communicated by telephone to the next station.

In Sri Lanka

LV board is also used by Sri Lanka Railways. This board is used for same purpose and is usually hung in a buffer of the last carriage. However, in DMUs, to indicate the last carriage (usually a driving/trailer car) red lights are used.

External links
Train working systems FAQ on Indian Railways Fan Club website

Rolling stock of India
Rolling stock of Sri Lanka